The 2009 Toyota Grand Prix of Long Beach was the second round of the 2009 IndyCar Series season, held on April 19, 2009. The race was contested over 85 laps of the  street course in Long Beach, California. Dario Franchitti recorded his first win since his 2007 championship win, after benefitting from an early full-course caution, having made a pitstop the lap before.

As a result of Champ Car World Series merged to IRL IndyCar Series, the IRL inherited Toyota Grand Prix of Long Beach event status for the first time.

Race

Standings after the race 

Drivers' Championship standings

 Note: Only the top five positions are included for the standings.

Long Beach
Toyota Grand Prix of Long Beach
Toyota Grand Prix of Long Beach
Grand Prix of Long Beach